Don Bowie (born December 9, 1969) is a professional high altitude climber from Alberta, Canada. Bowie’s climbing endeavors have taken him to remote regions of Nepal, Pakistan, Tibet, Africa, South America, Mexico, USA, and the high-arctic of Canada. In addition to being a world-class alpinist, he is an expert ski-mountaineer, avid mountain biker, long-distance trail-runner, and develops various projects portraying his climbing exploits as a writer, filmmaker, and photographer. Bowie now lives in Bishop, California, where he serves as an active member of the Inyo County Sheriff Search and Rescue Team.

Expedition Highlights 
 2005 Broad Peak (8047m/26,401 ft) Karakoram, Pakistan, West Ridge, Solo (to 7800m)
 2006 Cho Oyu (8188m/26,863 ft) Tibet Himalaya, Polish Ridge variation (to 8000m)
 2006 Annapurna (8091m/26,545 ft) Nepal Himalaya, East Ridge, new route (to 7300m)
 2007 K2 (8611m/28,253 ft) Karakoram, Pakistan, new route (to 6800m) Abruzzi Spur (summit)
 2008 Annapurna (8091m/26,545 ft) Nepal Himalaya, South Face/East Ridge (to 7300m)
 2008 Distaghil Sar (7886m/25,256 ft) Hispar Range, Pakistan, new route attempt
 2008 unnamed peak (5811m/19,065) Hispar, Pakistan, first ascent (summit)
 2008 unnamed peak (6347m/20,823 ft) Hispar, Pakistan, second ascent (summit)
 2008/9 Broad Peak (8047m/26,401 ft) Karakoram, Pakistan, West Ridge, in winter (to 7000m)
 2009 Gasherbrum III (7952m/26,089 ft) Karakoram, Pakistan, North Face, new route (to 7300m)
 2010 Gasherbrum I (8068m/26,650 ft) Karakoram Range, Pakistan, Japanese Couloir (summit)
 2011 Cho Oyu (summit) with Ueli Steck
 2019 Annapurna (Summit) after 6 attempts

See also
14 Peaks: Nothing Is Impossible, 2021 climbing film in which Bowie appears while climbing Annapurna

References 
 https://web.archive.org/web/20110727000527/http://krccnews.org/rccnews/don-bowie-at-cc/2008/11/24/4505
 https://web.archive.org/web/20110715084559/http://www.pioletsdor.com/index.php?option=com_content&view=article&id=113&Itemid=233&lang=en
 http://www.gore.com/en_xx/news/2008shiptontilman.html
 http://www.nickestcourtaward.org/HTML/PreviousWinners.htm
 http://www.thebmc.co.uk/News.aspx?id=3036
 https://web.archive.org/web/20120107173559/http://news.menshealth.com/train-for-mental-toughness/2011/12/22/

External links 
 Don Bowie Website

Canadian mountain climbers
1969 births
Living people
Sportspeople from Ontario
People from Bishop, California